The Nakajima Ki-44 Shoki (鍾馗, "Devil Queller") was a single-seat fighter-interceptor which was developed by the Nakajima Aircraft Company and operated by the Imperial Japanese Army from 1942 to 1945 during World War II. Its official designation was Army Type 2 Single-Seat Fighter (二式単座戦闘機) and its Allied reporting name was Tojo.

The design and development of the Ki-44 differed greatly from that of other Japanese fighters of the time, incorporating speed and rate-of-climb in preference to maneuverability. This was a result of a need for a heavy fighter aircraft that followed a more offensive doctrine and the Ki-44 is often classified as an Air Defence Fighter. Its development ran almost in parallel to its predecessor, the lighter and nimbler Nakajima Ki-43, and yet the two aircraft differed. The Ki-44 had a higher landing speed but was less maneuverable. These were concerns for pilots who would compare it to the Ki-43 or Ki-27 which were far more agile and responsive. As a result, the Ki-44 was first restricted to pilots with at least 1000 hours of flying time due to its tricky handling characteristics. However, it was later found that younger pilots who had not been instilled with the extensive aerobatic training of earlier cadres could manage the aircraft perfectly well, so the restriction was removed.

Nonetheless, the Ki-44 was the fastest climbing Japanese fighter at the time. It was the Imperial Japanese Army's only interceptor type when the USAAF's B-29 Superfortresses began bombing the Japanese mainland in June 1944. While there were performance restrictions at high altitude, it was superior to the Ki-43 in that it was capable of matching Allied aircraft in climbs and dives, giving pilots more flexibility in combat and greater pilot confidence than the Ki-43; the basic armament of four 12.7mm machine guns or two 12.7mm guns and two 20 mm cannons (or, in a few aircraft, two Ho-301 40mm cannons of limited range) was far more powerful than the older Ki-43's two 12.7mm machine guns.

Production of the Ki-44 was terminated in late 1944 in favour of the more advanced Nakajima Ki-84, and when the war ended, only three sentai units were still equipped with them.

No examples survive today.

Design and development 

Nakajima began development of the Ki-44 in 1940 as a pure interceptor with emphasis being placed on airspeed and rate of climb rather than maneuverability, a departure from the usual Japanese standards. The Japanese Army Air Force specification called for a maximum speed of 600 km/h (370 mph) at 4,000 m (13,130 ft), to be attained in five minutes. A set of Ki-43-like "butterfly" combat flaps was fitted for improved maneuverability. Armament consisted of a pair of 7.7 mm (.303 in) and a pair of 12.7 mm (.50 in) machine guns.

The engine selected for the new interceptor was Nakajima's Ha-41 (a development of the Nakajima Ha-5) 14-cylinder double-row radial, originally intended for bomber aircraft. Although the Ha-41 was not the ideal choice due to its large-diameter cross section, the design team was able to marry this engine to a much smaller fuselage with a narrow cross section. At 1,260 mm in diameter, the Ha-41 was 126 mm larger in diameter than the 1,144 mm Nakajima Sakae (used in the Mitsubishi A6M "Zero" and Nakajima Ki-43 "Hayabusa"). However, the Sakae was only 27.8L in displacement and 1,000 hp, while the Ha-41 was 37.5L and made 1,260 hp (1,440 in the later Ha-109 version). In any case, since the Sakae wasn't powerful enough, the only alternative available was the Mitsubishi Kinsei, which was slightly smaller than the Ha-41 in diameter, five liters smaller in displacement, and was less powerful. Unfortunately, this was already in demand for many other aircraft, so the Ha-41 was chosen as the best powerplant. In order to achieve its design goals, the wing area was relatively small leading to a high wing loading and a comparatively high landing speed that could be daunting to the average Japanese pilot, who was more used to aircraft with a low wing loading like the Ki-44's predecessors, the Ki-43 and Ki-27.

With an all-metal structure, the Ki-44 was metal-skinned except for the control surfaces, which were fabric covered. Relatively small wings gave the aircraft a high wing loading and consequently a high landing speed, which many pilots disliked.

The first Ki-44 prototype flew in August 1940 and the initial test flights were generally encouraging, with handling considered acceptable considering the high wing loading. Problems encountered included a high landing speed and poor forward visibility during taxiing due to the large radial engine.

A second pre-production batch of 40 aircraft were ordered, which featured four 12.7mm machine guns, a relocated air cooler and main gear doors.

Operational history 

The Nakajima Ki-44 at one point equipped 12 sentai ("groups/wings") of the Imperial Japanese Army Air Force: 9, 22, 23, 29, 47, 59, 64, 70, 85, 87, 104 and 246 Sentai. The Manchukuo Air Force also operated some Ki-44s.

Pre-production Ki-44 aircraft and two of the prototypes were turned over to the Army for service trials on 15 September 1941. The type commenced operations when nine aircraft were received by an experimental unit, 47th Chutai "Kawasemi Buntai" ("Kingfisher Flight, 47th Squadron"), commanded by Major Toshio Sakagawa at Saigon, Indochina in December 1941.

The Ki-44 also saw significant action with 87th Sentai in the air defense role, while based at Palembang, Sumatra. Other units equipped with the Ki-44 during the early part of the war were stationed in China, Burma, the Philippines and Korea.

Later in the war, the type saw action in an air defense role over the home islands – mainly around Japan's large industrial cities. 47 Chutai, after it was transferred to air defense roles in Japan, was expanded to become 47 Sentai.

The Ki-44-II Otsu (also known as the Ki-44-IIb) could be armed with a Ho-301 40 mm autocannon. While this was a relatively high-caliber weapon, it used caseless ammunition with a low muzzle velocity and short range, which was effective only in close attacks. Some of these aircraft were used against USAAF bombers by a special Shinten Seiku Tai (air superiority unit), comprising at least four aircraft, that was part of 47th Sentai, based at Narimasu airfield in Tokyo. Pilots from such units attempted to shoot down B-29s and, once their ammunition was expended, to ram them – effectively a suicide attack. While the concept appeared straightforward, ramming a B-29 at high altitudes was difficult to achieve in practice.

By the end of the war, Ki-44 variants were being replaced by the Nakajima Ki-84 Hayate, which was regarded as vastly superior – in aspects other than maintenance and reliability.

During 1946–49, both sides in the Chinese Revolution operated Ki-44s surrendered or abandoned by Japanese units. Air units of the People's Liberation Army obtained aircraft formerly belonging to 22 and 85 Sentai, which had disbanded in Chosen. Some of these aircraft were reportedly flown by Japanese veterans. Following the retreat of the Nationalists the People's Liberation Army Air Force (formed in 1949) used the Ki-44 until the early 1950s.

Surviving aircraft 
No complete surviving examples of the Ki-44 exist today. However, a wing center section is preserved at the Northwestern Polytechnical University Aviation Museum, at Xi'an in China.

Variants 

 Ki-44 First prototype (s/n 4401) with Ha-41 engine with a complex cooling system, unique for the first prototype.
 Ki-44 Nine pre-production aircraft (s/n 4402-4410), the first of which were quite different than the later ones. These aircraft were used for combat evaluation with the 47th Independent Fighter Chutai at the start of the Pacific War. Their armament consisted of two 7.7 mm (.303 in) Type 89 machine guns in the nose and two 12.7 mm (.50 in) Ho-103 machine guns in the wings. Type 89 telescopic gunsight protruding through the windscreen. Provision for a single drop tank under the fuselage centre line or two drop tanks under the wings. Recognisable by their pointed spinner caps.
 Ki-44-I Powered by a 930 kW (1,250 hp) Nakajima Ha-41 engine with annular oil cooler, with a maximum speed of 580 km/h (363 mph). Armament and gunsight were unchanged from the pre-production models. Provision for two drop tanks under the wings. Rounded spinner caps with provision for Hucks starter. Late models had external fuel coolers. Forty produced (s/n 111-150).
 Ki-44-II Ko (Ki-44-IIa) Powered by a 1,074 kW (1,440 hp) Nakajima Ha-109 engine with external oil cooler and a top speed of 604 km/h (378 mph). Armament, gunsight and drop tank provision as for Ki-44-I. Rectangular cockpit access doors replaced the rounded version of earlier models. 355 produced (s/n 1001-1355).
 Ki-44-II Otsu (Ki-44-IIb)Standard armament reduced to just two 12.7 mm (.50 in) Ho-103 machine guns in the nose. Optional provision for two 40 mm (1.57 in) Ho-301 cannons in the wings. These were not always installed due to disappointing combat results and were sometimes replaced with two 12.7 mm (.50 in) Ho-103 machine guns. This variant retained the Type 89 telescopic gunsight as standard. 394 produced (s/n 1356-1749).
 Ki-44-II Hei (Ki-44-IIc)Standard armament of four 12.7 mm (.50 in) Ho-103 machine guns, two in the nose and two in the wings. Type 100 reflector gunsight mounted as standard. 427 produced (s/n 1750-2176).
 Ki-44-III A single prototype built, powered by a Ha-145 two-row 18-cylinder engine of 1,491 kW (2,000 hp).
 Ki-44-III Ko (Ki-44-IIIa) Proposed variant with an armament of four 20 mm Ho-5 cannons.
 Ki-44-III Otsu (Ki-44-IIIb) Proposed variant with armament of two 20 mm Ho-5 cannons and two 37 mm (1.46 in) Ho-203 cannons.

Total production: 1,227

Operators 
Wartime

Manchukuo Air Force

Imperial Japanese Army Air Force

No. 9 Hikō Sentai IJAAF
No. 22 Hikō Sentai IJAAF
No. 23 Hikō Sentai IJAAF
No. 29 Hikō Sentai IJAAF
No. 47 Dokuritsu Hikō Chutai IJAAF/Hikō Sentai IJAAF
No. 59 Hikō Sentai IJAAF
No. 64 Hikō Sentai IJAAF
No. 70 Hikō Sentai IJAAF
No. 85 Hikō Sentai IJAAF
No. 87 Hikō Sentai IJAAF
No. 104 Hikō Sentai IJAAF
No. 246 Hikō Sentai IJAAF
Akeno Army Flight Training School
Hitachi Army Flight Training School

Post-War

Chinese Nationalist Air Force operated some captured aircraft
 No. 18 Chungtui (中隊 ~ Squadron) CNAF October 1945 – August 1946

Specifications (Ki-44-II Otsu)

See also

References

Citations

Bibliography
 
 
 
 
  (new edition 1987 by Putnam Aeronautical Books, .)
 Green, William. War Planes of the Second World War, Volume Three: Fighters. London: Macdonald & Co. (Publishers) Ltd., 1961 (seventh impression 1973). .
 Green, William and Gordon Swanborough. WW2 Aircraft Fact Files: Japanese Army Fighters, Part 2. London: Macdonald and Jane's Publishers Ltd., 1977. .

 "Nakajima Ki.44 (Ni Shiki Tansen Sentoki Shoki)" (in Japanese). Maru Mechanic No. 9, March 1978.

Low-wing aircraft
Ki-044, Nakajima
Ki-044, Nakajima
Ki-044
Single-engined tractor aircraft
Aircraft first flown in 1940